Jarrie is a commune in the Isère department in southeastern France. It is part of the Grenoble urban unit (agglomeration).

Population

Twin towns
Jarrie is twinned with:

  Macael, Spain, since 1989

See also
Communes of the Isère department

References

Communes of Isère
Isère communes articles needing translation from French Wikipedia